Janet Mary Lord  is a British biologist who is a Professor of Cell Biology at the University of Birmingham. Her research considers immunity in old age, with a focus on the decline of neutrophil function. She was made a Commander of the British Empire in the 2023 New Year Honours List.

Early life and education 
Lord studied biology at Oxford Brookes University, then moved to Aston University for her doctoral research, where she studied the impact of hypoglycaemic drugs and obesity on insulin receptor binding. She joined the University of Oxford as a research fellow.

Research and career 
Lord researches the effect of ageing on immune function, and how this impacts the ability of older people to resolve inflammation. Her research has shown that exercise helps to slow the ageing process. She showed that older adults who don't take exercise have neutrophils which aren't as effective and have high levels of cortisol. Elevated levels of cortisol have a negative impact on ageing, including increasing muscle and bone loess and raising blood pressure. Lord joined the University of Birmingham early in her career, first as a Royal Society University Research Fellow and then professor in 2004.

Lord is Director of the Medical Research Council for musculoskeletal ageing research. The centre is located in the Queen Elizabeth Hospital Birmingham. She was a member of the Academy of Medical Sciences Healthy Ageing Forum, a group which looked to understand ageing research and priorities the most effective intervention.

Lord is part of the CARINA (CAtalyst Reducing ImmuNe Ageing) Network. The network looks to understand the immune system throughout human life.

Awards and honours 
 2013 British Society for Research into Ageing Lord Cohen Medal 
 2015 Elected Fellow of the Academy of Medical Sciences
 2022 Elected to the Order of the British Empire

Selected publications

References 

Living people
Alumni of Oxford Brookes University
Alumni of Aston University
Academics of the University of Birmingham
20th-century British biologists
21st-century British biologists
British women biologists
Commanders of the Order of the British Empire
Fellows of the Academy of Medical Sciences (United Kingdom)
20th-century British women scientists
21st-century British women scientists
Year of birth missing (living people)